Marcelino Iglesias Ricou (born 16 April 1951) is a Spanish politician and member of the Spanish Socialist Workers' Party. He was the President of the Government of Aragon between 1999 and 2011.

References

1951 births
Leaders of political parties in Spain
Living people
Members of the 9th Senate of Spain
Members of the 10th Senate of Spain
Members of the 11th Senate of Spain
Members of the 12th Senate of Spain
Members of the 13th Senate of Spain
Presidents of the Government of Aragon
Spanish Socialist Workers' Party politicians